The fourth season of Criminal Minds premiered on CBS on September 24, 2008, and ended May 20, 2009.

Cast

Main 
 Joe Mantegna as Supervisory Special Agent David Rossi (BAU Senior Agent)
 Paget Brewster as Supervisory Special Agent Emily Prentiss (BAU Agent)
 Shemar Moore as Supervisory Special Agent Derek Morgan (BAU Agent)
 Matthew Gray Gubler as Supervisory Special Agent Dr. Spencer Reid (BAU Agent)
 A. J. Cook as Supervisory Special Agent Jennifer "JJ" Jareau (BAU Communications Liaison)
 Kirsten Vangsness as Special Agent Penelope Garcia (BAU Technical Analyst)
 Thomas Gibson as Supervisory Special Agent Aaron "Hotch" Hotchner (BAU Unit Chief)

Special guest stars 
 Luke Perry as Benjamin Cyrus
 Jason Alexander as Professor Rothchild
 Cybill Shepherd as Leona Gless

Recurring 
 Meta Golding as Special Agent Jordan Todd (BAU Interim Communications Liaison)
 Nicholas Brendon as Kevin Lynch
 Jane Lynch as Diana Reid
 Cade Owens as Jack Hotchner
 Josh Stewart as William "Will" LaMontagne Jr.

Guest stars 

In the season premiere "Mayhem", Sienna Guillory and Erik Palladino reprise as SSA Kate Joyner and Detective Cooper, respectively. Adoni Maropis guest-starred as Ben Abner, a member of the NYC Terrorist Cell who disguises as a paramedic, and Michael Steger guest-starred as Sam, another member of the cell. In the episode "The Angel Maker", Lauren Bowles guest-starred as Chloe Kelcher, the copycat killer and love interest of Courtland Bryce Ryan, aka "The Angel Maker", played by Neil Hopkins. Blake Lindsley guest-starred as Shara Carlino, another attempted copycat and admirer of Ryan. In the episode "Minimal Loss", Luke Perry guest-starred as Benjamin Cyrus, the leader of a religious cult known as the "Separatarian Sect". Jeff Fahey guest-starred as Leo Kane, an inmate and fervent libertarian who founded the Liberty Ranch. In the episode "Paradise", William Mapother and Robyn Lively guest-starred as Ian and Abby Corbin, a married couple who go on vacation, only to be held captive by Floyd Hansen.  

In the episode "The Instincts", Melinda Page Hamilton guest-starred as Claire Bates, a child abductor who kidnaps a young boy. In the episode "Memoriam", Taylor Nichols guest-starred as Spencer Reid's father, William, who confesses to murdering Gary Michaels, a pedophile who intended to rape and murder Reid after he already raped and murdered another young boy. Dee Wallace guest starred as Reid's therapist, Dr. Jan Mohikian. In the episode "Masterpiece", Jason Alexander guest-starred as Henry Grace, a serial killer obsessed with the fibonacci sequence. In the episode "52 Pickup", Gabriel Olds guest-starred as Robert Parker, a serial killer who has perfected his skills as a pick-up artist. Courtney Ford guest-starred as Austin, a bartender who develops a crush on Reid. Currie Graham guest-starred as Paul "Viper" Thomas, another pick-up artist who was a suspect in the murders, and Joanna Cassidy guest-starred as Mrs. Holden, a woman whose youngest daughter Vanessa, is murdered by Parker.

In the episode "Normal", Mitch Pileggi guest-starred as Norman Hill, aka "The Road Warrior", a man who goes on a murderous rampage after murdering his entire family. Faith Ford guest-starred as Norman's deceased wife, Vanessa, and Gina Torres guest-starred as Detective Thea Salinas, who leads the investigation of the murders. In the episode "Soul Mates", George Newbern and Michael Boatman guest-starred as Steven Baleman and William Harris, aka, "The Soul Mates", a duo of serial rapists who murdered several women. Dana Davis guest-starred as William's daughter Andrea. In the episode "Bloodline", Andrew Divoff and Cynthia Gibb guest-starred as Lewis and Kathy "Sylvia" Gray, a gypsy couple who abducted young girls for their son to marry by the time he comes of age.

  
In the episode "Cold Comfort", Vondie Curtis-Hall guest-starred as Stanley Usher, a self-proclaimed psychic of whom David Rossi is skeptical, and Cybill Shepherd as Leona Gless. In the episode "Zoe's Reprise", Amy Davidson guest-starred as Zoe Hawkes, an admirer of Rossi who aspires to become an FBI agent, only to be murdered by Eric Olson, played by Johnny Lewis. Shannon Woodward guest-starred as Eric's girlfriend, Linda Jones. In the episode "Pleasure Is My Business", Brianna Brown guest starred as Megan Kane, a call girl who fatally poisons her clients. In the episode "Demonology", Carmen Argenziano guest-starred as Father Paul Silvano, an Italian priest who murders his victims through exorcisms. Bruce Davison guest-starred as Paul's accomplice, Father Jimmy Davison. 

In the episode "Omnivore", C. Thomas Howell guest-starred as George Foyet, the only person who survived a string of killings committed by a killer known as "The Boston Reaper". Louis Ferreira guest-starred as Roy Colson, a novelist and the author of the novel Night of The Reaper. In the episode "House on Fire", Tommy Dewey guest-starred as Tommy Wheeler, a serial arsonist who burns down a movie theater, killing everyone trapped in it. Shannon Lucio guest-starred as Tommy's sister Tina. In the episode "Conflicted", Jackson Rathbone guest-starred as Adam Jackson, a delusional serial killer who has a female alter-ego named Amanda. Susan Ward guest-starred as Julie Riley, a hotel manager who was suspected of committing the murders of several men. Roma Maffia guest-starred as Detective Reese Evans, who leads the investigation of the murders. 

In the episode "The Big Wheel", Alex O'Loughlin guest-starred as Vincent Rowlings, a repentant serial killer who suffers from uncontrollable homicidal urges. In the episode "Amplification", Tamlyn Tomita guest-starred as Dr. Linda Kimura, who aids the BAU with the investigation of an anthrax outbreak that has infected several people. In the two-part season finale "To Hell and Back", Garret Dillahunt guest-starred as Mason Turner, whose developmentally disabled brother and partner in crime, Lucas, abducts a teenage girl and holds her captive at a barn in Canada. C. Thomas Howell reprises as George Foyet, who breaks into Aaron Hotchner's apartment and seemingly shoots him. Hotch's fate is left unknown until the premiere of the following season.

Episodes

Home media

References

External links

Criminal Minds
2008 American television seasons
2009 American television seasons